Günther Jerschke (1921–1997) was a German actor.

Selected filmography

 Pour le Mérite (1938) - Adjutant des Kommandeurs der Flieger
 Die verschleierte Maja (1951)
 Kommen Sie am Ersten (1951) - Inspizient
 Under the Thousand Lanterns (1952) - Metzler
 Toxi (1952)
 Der Weg zu Dir (1952)
 Fight of the Tertia (1952) - Dr. Grau
 Dreaming Lips (1953) - Sekretär
 Das singende Hotel (1953)
 Die Privatsekretärin (1953)
 Wedding in Transit (1953) - Reiseteilnehmer
 Men at a Dangerous Age (1954) - Butz (Butzinzky, Sekretär)
 Der Mann meines Lebens (1954)
 Three from Variety (1954)
 Three Days Confined to Barracks (1955) - Musketier Sanftmut
 Zu Befehl, Frau Feldwebel (1956) - Krischke
 Nina (1956) - Leutnant Sergejeff
 Confessions of Felix Krull (1957) - 2. Polizeibeamter
 Doctor Crippen Lives (1958) - Gendarm
 The Daughter of Hamburg (1958)
 Bühne frei für Marika (1958)
 Der Schinderhannes (1958) - Welscher Jockel
 The Man Who Sold Himself (1959) - Dr. Zerbst
 Crime After School (1959) - Verteidiger Dr. Baumriss
 Of Course, the Motorists (1959) - 1. LKW-Fahrer (uncredited)
 Der Frosch mit der Maske (1959) - Newsreader on Radio (voice, uncredited)
 The Buddenbrooks (1959, part 1, 2) - Kandidat Modersohn
 Salem Aleikum (1959) - Ali Ben Ali
 Triplets on Board (1959) - Reinwald - Fernsehreporter
 Der Teufel spielte Balalaika (1961) - Gellert
 The Dead Eyes of London (1961) - Polizeiarzt (German version) / Coroner (English version) (uncredited)
 The Forger of London (1961) - Rechtsanwalt Radlow / Radio-Kommentator (voice, uncredited)
 Our House in Cameroon (1961) - Herr Biermann (uncredited)
 The Liar (1961) - Inspektor
 The Puzzle of the Red Orchid (1962) - Mr. Shelby
 Encounter in Salzburg (1964) - Direktor Wechsel
 Polizeirevier Davidswache (1964) - Nörgler (uncredited)
 Un milliard dans un billard (1965)
 Die Rechnung - eiskalt serviert (1966) - Chuck (voice, uncredited)
 Elsk... din næste! (1967)
 The Heathens of Kummerow (1967) - Niemeier
 Angels of the Street (1969) - Rechtsanwalt Quassel (voice, uncredited)
 That Can't Shake Our Willi! (1970) - Heimo Buntje
 St. Pauli Report (1971) - Oskar

External links
 

1921 births
1997 deaths
German male film actors
German male television actors
Actors from Wrocław
People from the Province of Lower Silesia
20th-century German male actors